This is a list of lighthouses in Antigua and Barbuda.

Active lighthouses

Inactive lighthouses

See also
 Lists of lighthouses and lightvessels

References

External links
 

Antigua and Barbuda
Lighthouses
Antigua and Barbuda
Lighthouses
Lighthouses